Sharain Cummings is a Trinidadian footballer who plays as a midfielder. She has been a member of the Trinidad and Tobago women's national team.

International goals
Scores and results list Trinidad and Tobago's goal tally first

References

Living people
Women's association football midfielders
Trinidad and Tobago women's footballers
People from Tunapuna–Piarco
People from Arima
Trinidad and Tobago women's international footballers
Essex County College alumni
Trinidad and Tobago expatriate women's footballers
Trinidad and Tobago expatriate sportspeople in the United States
Expatriate women's soccer players in the United States
Year of birth missing (living people)